Friedberg is a German surname meaning "peace mountain". Notable people with the surname include:

 Aaron Friedberg (born 1956), former deputy assistant for national-security affairs and director of policy planning
 Bernard Friedberg (1876–1961), Austrian Hebraist
 Charles K. Friedberg (1905–1972), American cardiologist
 Emil Albert Friedberg (1837–1910), German canonist
 Gertrude Friedberg (1908–1989), American playwright and author
 Heinrich von Friedberg (1813–1895), German jurist and statesman
 Hermann Friedberg (1817–1884), surgeon, forensic doctor
 Jason Friedberg (born 1971), American screenwriter and director
John Friedberg (born 1961), American Olympic fencer
 M. Paul Friedberg (born 1931), American landscape architect
Paul Friedberg (born 1959), American Olympic fencer
Richard M. Friedberg (born 1935), American theoretical physicist

German-language surnames
Jewish surnames
Yiddish-language surnames